James Gordon Beckham III (born September 16, 1986) is an American former professional baseball infielder who serves as a fill-in sportscaster for the Chicago White Sox of Major League Baseball. He played in Major League Baseball (MLB) for the Chicago White Sox, Los Angeles Angels of Anaheim, Atlanta Braves, San Francisco Giants, Seattle Mariners, and Detroit Tigers.

Amateur career
A native of Atlanta, Beckham attended The Westminster Schools, where he played quarterback and free safety on the football team.

Beckham went on to play college baseball for the University of Georgia. As a freshman in 2006, Beckham started all 81 at shortstop, helping to lead the Bulldogs to the College World Series. He was named a Freshman All-American that year. As a sophomore, he started all 56 games that Georgia played. After his sophomore season in 2007, he played collegiate summer baseball for the Yarmouth–Dennis Red Sox of the Cape Cod Baseball League, where he batted .284 with 9 home runs in 42 games, was named the starting shortstop for the East Division All-Star team, and helped lead the Red Sox to the league championship.

As a junior, he was the only unanimous selection to the All-SEC First Team and was selected as the SEC Player of the Year. He was also selected as an All-American, an Academic All-American, a Finalist for the NCAA Player of the Year and a Finalist for the Golden Spikes Award. He led the NCAA in home runs that year, setting the school's single season home run record (26) and tied the school record for most home runs in a career (51) against NC State on June 8, 2008 in the deciding third game of the Super Regionals that sent Georgia to the College World Series. The home run came on his last at-bat at his home Foley Field, after which he received a curtain call. On June 25, 2008 with his last at bat as a college player, Beckham tied Matt Clark of LSU as the 2008 season home run leader (28).

Professional career

Minor leagues
Beckham was selected eighth overall in the 2008 Major League Baseball Draft by the Chicago White Sox. Considered the number 1 rated prospect in the Chicago White Sox system at the start of the 2009 season according to Baseball America, Beckham played in the Arizona Fall League for the Peoria Saguaros. He lit up the AFL, hitting .394 with 3 HRs and a .468 OBP in 66 at-bats. He continued to impress in Spring Training, hitting .270 with 2 HR and 6 RBI in 37 at-bats. He forced his way into contention for the Sox' 25-man opening day roster, but it was eventually decided that he should start the season at the Sox' Double-A affiliate, the Birmingham Barons. After batting .299 over 38 games with the Barons, Beckham was promoted to Class AAA Charlotte Knights on May 27, 2009 and switched from his natural position at shortstop to third base. This was seen as a clear indication that he was being prepared for a Major League call-up, as White Sox third baseman Josh Fields was struggling at the plate and on defense.

Chicago White Sox

On June 3, 2009, the White Sox purchased Beckham's contract, adding him to the major league roster after he had hit .326 with 23 doubles, four home runs and 25 RBI in 175 at-bats between Double-A Birmingham and Triple-A Charlotte. Thus, Beckham reached the Majors 364 days after he was selected by the White Sox. He became the second position player from his draft class, behind the Giants' Conor Gillaspie, to make his MLB debut when, on June 4, 2009, he started at third base for the White Sox against the Oakland Athletics. In his debut Beckham went 0-3 with a strikeout and reached on a fielder's choice. He became the Sox' everyday starting third baseman, due to Josh Fields, and utility infielder Wilson Betemit's inadequacies at the plate and on defense.

Beckham struggled initially in the major leagues, going 2-for-28 over his first eight games. He got his first MLB hit, a single to center field, in his 14th at-bat on June 9, 2009 at U.S. Cellular Field, after which he received a standing ovation from the home crowd. On June 20, 2009, Beckham hit his first major league home run, a three-run shot in the fourth inning of the annual MLB Civil Rights Game, off Cincinnati Reds starting pitcher Johnny Cueto. Beckham's milestone home run came while the Reds were ahead 5-0, and sparked a comeback victory for the Sox. On June 27, 2009, Beckham hit a walk-off single with two men on and two out in the bottom of the 9th inning against the crosstown rival Chicago Cubs, his first walk-off hit. On June 29, 2009, Beckham went 3 for 3  with a walk and 2 RBIs as the Sox beat the Cleveland Indians, 6-3.

On October 20, 2009, Beckham was named the Sporting News' 2009 American League Rookie of the Year, as selected by a panel of 338 major league players, 22 managers and 31 general managers and assistant general managers. On October 26, 2009 Beckham was voted the American League Rookie of the Year by the MLBPA, which is voted on in September by every player on a major league roster.

Los Angeles Angels of Anaheim
On August 21, 2014 Beckham was traded to the Los Angeles Angels of Anaheim for a player to be named later. The trade was completed on February 4, 2015, as minor leaguer Yency Almonte was sent to the White Sox.

Return to the White Sox
On January 28, 2015, Beckham signed a one-year, $2 million contract to return to the Chicago White Sox.

Atlanta Braves
Beckham signed a one-year deal with his hometown team, the Atlanta Braves on December 4, 2015. He since battled hamstring injuries with two stints on the disabled list.

San Francisco Giants
On September 27, 2016, Beckham was traded to the Giants for minor leaguer Rich Rodriguez with just six games left in the 2016 season. On February 8, 2017, Beckham re-signed with the Giants. On March 23, 2017, he requested (and was granted) his release so he could seek other opportunities.

Seattle Mariners
On March 31, 2017, the Mariners signed Beckham to a minor league contract. He appeared in 11 games for the Mariners in 2017, and signed another minor league contract with Seattle on December 12, 2017. He was released on March 23. He re-signed to a new minor league deal on March 26, 2018. He was called up on July 10. He played a total of 22 games for Seattle.

Detroit Tigers
On January 22, 2019, Beckham signed a minor league contract with the Detroit Tigers that included an invitation to spring training. On March 23, 2019, the Tigers added Beckham to their 25 man roster. Beckham had just 223 at-bats for the 2019 Tigers, hitting .215 with 6 home runs and 15 RBI. Beckham became a free agent following the 2019 season.

San Diego Padres
On February 10, 2020, Beckham agreed to a minor league contract with the San Diego Padres. He was released on March 14, 2020.

New York Mets
On June 29, 2020, Beckham signed a minor league contract with the New York Mets. He was released on July 22.

On January 27, 2022, Beckham retired from professional baseball.

Personal life
Beckham's father, James Gordon Beckham Jr., played quarterback for the University of South Carolina. His mother also attended the University of South Carolina, where she was a cheerleader for both football and basketball. Gordon has two younger sisters, Gwen, and Grace.

Beckham was an honorary member of the Chi Phi Fraternity while attending the University of Georgia.

Beckham announced via Twitter in December 2012 that he was engaged to Brittany Fletcher, the daughter of Scott Fletcher. They married on November 9, 2013.

References

External links

 

1986 births
Living people
Baseball players from Atlanta
Major League Baseball second basemen
Chicago White Sox players
Los Angeles Angels players
Atlanta Braves players
San Francisco Giants players
Seattle Mariners players
Detroit Tigers players
Georgia Bulldogs baseball players
Kannapolis Intimidators players
Peoria Saguaros players
Charlotte Knights players
Birmingham Barons players
Gwinnett Braves players
Gulf Coast Braves players
Carolina Mudcats players
Tacoma Rainiers players
All-American college baseball players
The Westminster Schools alumni
Yarmouth–Dennis Red Sox players